The 1908 Vermont gubernatorial election took place on September 1, 1908. Incumbent Republican Fletcher D. Proctor, per the "Mountain Rule", did not run for re-election to a second term as Governor of Vermont. Republican candidate George H. Prouty defeated Democratic candidate, Burlington mayor James Edmund Burke to succeed him.

Results

References

Vermont
1908
Gubernatorial
September 1908 events